Battle of Khotyn can refer to several battles that took place near Khotyn:
 Battle of Khotyn (1509)
 Battle of Khotyn (1530)
 Battle of Khotyn (1621)
 Battle of Khotyn (1673)
 Siege of Khotyn (1788)